Copromyza nigrina is a species of fly in the family Sphaeroceridae. It is found in the  Palearctic .

References

External links
Ecology of Commanster 

Sphaeroceridae
Insects described in 1847
Muscomorph flies of Europe